The Wall of Trujillo was a Peruvian defensive edification built in the 17th century to protect Trujillo city against attacks from pirates and privateers. It was constructed by Viceroy Melchor de Navarra y Rocafull between 1687 and 1690, it surrounded the current historic centre of the city and included 15 bastions and five gates. It was torn down towards the end of 19th century to allow the construction of new neighborhoods as the city expanded.

Some sections of the wall can still be seen today, including parts that have been restored in El Recreo Square  at the end of Pizarro Street in the historic center, which is now a public area. There are also still fragments of the wall conserved on España Avenue. Trujillo was one of three walled cities during Spanish rule in the Americas, the other two being Lima and Cartagena.

History

The wall was built during the Hispanic period to protect the city from pirate attacks, which were a common threat given Trujillo's proximity to the sea (roughly 5 km from the main plaza). Most colonial cities along the northern coast were subject to these attacks. Guayaquil was attacked in June 1624 by the Dutch army under the command of Jean Claude de Gubernat, who received the order from deputy Jaques L’Heremite Clerk. More than 20 houses were burned during the siege. The city also maraudered by William Dampier in 1684, and by French pirates D’Hout, Picard and Groignet in 1687, who left the city half-destroyed. It was also bombarded by pirates from the Peruvian city of Saña. Given the looming threat of attack, the Wall of Trujillo was built in the 17th century during the reign of Viceroy Melchor de Navarra y Rocafull. It was constructed by Italian Joseph Formento in 1687 under the leadership of mayors Bartolomé Martínez de Jarabeitia and Fernando Ramírez de Orellana. Formento based his design on a similar work done by Leonardo da Vinci for the Italian city of Florence.

Architecture
It was designed in an elliptical shape and completed around the year 1690. The defensive structure was composed of 15 bastions, 15 curtains and 5 gates. The gate of Huamán was oriented towards the southwest and led to the village of the same name. The gate of Mansiche was in the north. The gate of Miraflores was to the northeast. The gate of la Sierra was towards the road leading to this region and finally the gate of Moche that gave access to people from the south. In 1942, on the space occupied by the Wall of Trujillo, España Avenue was built. The same as is currently around the area called Historic Centre of Trujillo. The wall lacked moats and embankments.

Current conservation
Some of the parts that are still surviving of the wall are:
 Bastión Herrera located in the intersection of España Avenue with the Miraflores Avenue, also comprises the area of the former Gate of Miraflores, the wisp and the old part of the Graveyard of Miraflores (19th century) plus the adjacent streets to the bastion: Minería, Gremios and Comercio.
 Curtain of España Avenue includes the restored curtain of the wall located in the block 18 of España Avenue and is opposite the site of the former railway station of Trujillo.
 Bastión Bazán comprises the area where are remains of the former Baluarte de Bazán, in the block 26 of España Avenue, between the Club Tell, 28 Julio Avenue and the local of the Municipal Box of Trujillo.
 Gate of la Sierra is a replica of the gate of the same name of the ancient wall has been built in the Plazuela El Recreo near the end of the Pizarro street, in the historic center of the city.

See also
 Trujillo, Peru
 Historic Centre of Trujillo
 Defensive wall

References

External links
 Map of the Historic Centre of Trujillo

Multimedia 

 Historic Centre of Trujillo by Panoramio, includes information by several authors.
 Colonial Imaages Coloniales of the Historic Centre of Trujillo

Buildings and structures in Trujillo, Peru
City walls in Peru
Demolished buildings and structures in Peru